The Woman in His House may refer to:

 The Woman in His House (1920 film), an American silent drama film
 The Animal Kingdom, also known as The Woman in His House, a 1932 American pre-Code comedy-drama film